Henry W. Barnett (January 9, 1927 – May 11, 1994) was an American politician who served in the New York State Assembly from the 89th district from 1983 to 1992.

References

1927 births
1994 deaths
Republican Party members of the New York State Assembly
20th-century American politicians